The 1962–63 National Football League was the 32nd staging of the National Football League (NFL), an annual Gaelic football tournament for the Gaelic Athletic Association county teams of Ireland.

New York again got a bye to the final. Kerry beat them by 8 points.

Format

Results

Division IV

Final

Group A

Group B

Knockout stage

Finals

References

National Football League
National Football League
National Football League (Ireland) seasons